February is an unincorporated community in Washington County, Tennessee.

History
A post office called February was established in 1884, and remained in operation until 1899. One Mr. February, a local postal official, gave the community his last name.

References

Unincorporated communities in Washington County, Tennessee
Unincorporated communities in Tennessee